Safiullah (1946 — 25 October 2008) was a Bangladeshi politician and a member of parliament for the Comilla-26 constituency as a member of the Awami League.

Career
Safiullah was elected to the Jatiya Sangsad representing the Comilla-26 constituency as an Awami League candidate in 1973.

Death
Safiullah died on 25 October 2008.

References

Awami League politicians
1st Jatiya Sangsad members
1946 births
2008 deaths